The Eastside Rail Corridor, officially Eastrail, is a rail right of way where a rail trail has been under development in the Eastside suburbs of Seattle, Washington.  The corridor follows the path of the former Woodinville Subdivision from Renton to the City of Snohomish at Snohomish Junction. , the northern portion was still in operation by Eastside Freight Railroad.

History

Acquisition

The Port of Seattle acquired the right of way of the former Woodinville Subdivision from BNSF Railway through purchase and donation in 2008. A portion of the central corridor, named the Cross Kirkland Corridor, is owned by the City of Kirkland; a spur to Redmond, named the Redmond Central Connector, is owned by the City of Redmond; a portion in downtown Bellevue was purchased by Sound Transit, and a northern portion of the corridor remains Port property for dual use as a trail and freight line. Some state residents brought suit against the Port of Seattle because the purchase was not used for freight in its entirety. In 2016, Snohomish County acquired the right of way from the King–Snohomish County line at Woodinville north to the city of Snohomish.

Opening

In January, 2015, the  Kirkland portion of the Eastside Rail Corridor, with compacted gravel surfacing, opened for pedestrians and bicyclists.

The Kirkland–Bellevue section was opened in July 2018, connecting State Route 520 (and its bike trail) to the Spring District. It was christened as Eastrail on July 20, 2019.

Eastside Greenway Alliance
In January 2016, community leaders gathered in Bellevue, Washington, for a one day summit about transforming the  Eastside Rail Corridor into a multi-use trail. Prior to the meeting, planning and construction of various corridor segments had been underway for years.

The group envisioned a partnership of established and reputable regional and national nonprofits to collectively advocate for the trail. The Alliance would initially be co-led by Cascade Bicycle Club and The Trust for Public Land.

Cities and connections
Cities through which the corridor passes include:
Renton
Newcastle
Bellevue
Kirkland
Redmond (Redmond Central Connector)
Woodinville
Snohomish

Trail connections
If constructed as proposed by King County, these other trails would or could link to the Eastside Rail Corridor:
Burke-Gilman Trail / Sammamish River Trail
East Lake Sammamish Trail
Cedar River Trail
Soos Creek Trail
Snoqualmie Valley Trail
Green River Trail
Interurban Trail
Snohomish County Centennial Trail
Lake-to-Lake Trail (Bellevue)
Lake-to-Sound Trail (Renton to Des Moines)
Mountains to Sound Greenway Trail (I-90)
State Route 520 Trail
Tolt Pipeline Trail

Railroad ownership
BNSF sold the running rights to Tom Payne, GNP Railway, between Woodinville and Snohomish in conjunction with the sale to the Port of Seattle. GNP's partner, Ballard Terminal Railroad, took over freight operations from BNSF Railway in January 2010. By 2011 Ballard Terminal Railroad was filing with other creditors in U.S. Bankruptcy Court for an involuntary reorganization of GNP.  

A short line terminal railroad operating in Seattle, the Ballard Terminal Railroad, filed suit in the US District Court for the Western District of Washington and petitioned the Surface Transportation Board on April 1, 2013, seeking to prevent the City of Kirkland from removing the rail tracks for the planned trail. The Ballard Terminal Railroad wanted to keep the tracks intact for future rail freight use.  On May 3, 2013, Federal District Court Judge Marsha Pechman granted the City of Kirkland's motion to dismiss the case filed by Ballard Terminal Railroad Company seeking to prevent rail salvage on the Cross Kirkland Corridor. In her oral ruling, Judge Pechman stated the Federal District Court did not have jurisdiction to consider Ballard's temporary restraining order (TRO) and that the Surface Transportation Board was the proper forum for adjudicating Ballard's claims. On August 1, 2013, the Surface Transportation Board denied the request by Ballard Terminal Railroad Company to block rail removal along the Cross Kirkland Corridor.

References

Further reading

External links
Official site
Eastside Greenway Alliance, coalition of non-profits advocating for the Eastside Rail Corridor Trail
Eastside Rail Corridor at King County government website
Eastside Trail Advocates
Eastside Rail Now

Rail trails in Washington (state)
Geography of King County, Washington
Transportation in King County, Washington